Riding High may refer to:

Books 

Riding High, a 1987 book written by John Francome
Riding High, a 1998 book by British journalist Ted Simon
Riding High, a 1946 book by Lenora Mattingly Weber

Film and television 

Riding High (1937 film), a British comedy film starring Helen Haye
Riding High (1943 film), starring Dorothy Lamour and Dick Powell
Riding High (1950 film), starring Bing Crosby and Coleen Gray
Riding High (1981 film), a British film
Riding High (Canadian TV series), a Canadian music television series
Riding High (New Zealand TV series), a 1995 television series from New Zealand about horses

Music

Albums
Ridin High (8Ball & MJG album), 2007 (also the name of the third song in the track)
Riding High (Chilliwack album), 1974 (also the name of the fifth song in the track)
Riding High (Faze-O album), 1977 (also the name of the first song in the track)
Ridin' High (The Impressions album), 1966 (also the name of the first song in the track)
Riding High - The Unreleased Third Album, a 2000 album by Lone Star
Ridin' High (Maynard Ferguson album), 1968
Ridin' High (Moxy album), 1977 (also the name of the fifth song in the track)
Ridin' High (Martha and the Vandellas album),1968
Ridin' High (Robert Palmer album), 1992 (also the name of the fifteenth song in the track)
Ridin' High (Margo Smith album), 1981 (also the name of the sixth song in the track)
Ridin' High, a 1975 album by Jerry Jeff Walker

Songs
"Ridin' High" (song), a 1936 song by Cole Porter
"Riding High", a 1967 song by People!
"Riding High", a 1998 song by Tracy Shaw
"Riding High", a 1994 song from the Traffic album Far from Home
"Riding High", a 1971 song on The Wailers album Soul Revolution Part II
"Riding High", a 2001 song on The Wash soundtrack

Other 

Riding high, a sexual variation of the missionary position